Greg Mescall (born December 20, 1981) is a sports broadcaster and host covering a variety of sports for different networks. 2018 marked Mescall's second Olympic Games for Westwood One Sports/NBC Radio where he covered freestyle ski and snowboard including Shaun White's return to the podium. Currently calling Manhattan College men's basketball, Mescall has also worked for ESPN, Pac-12 Network, Olympic Channel, Big Ten Network, ESPNU Fox Sports West, and USA Water Polo, and has done play-by-play for the Metro Atlantic Athletic Conference, IVY League on ESPN+ and Monmouth University's ESPN digital broadcasts.

Personal 
A native of Leonardo, New Jersey, Mescall earned his B.A. in communication, Radio and Television from Monmouth University, and an M.S. in education from Wagner College.

References 

Living people
1981 births
American radio sports announcers
American television sports announcers
College basketball announcers in the United States
College football announcers
Monmouth University alumni
Wagner College alumni